Churney is a surname. Notable people with the surname include:

 Russell Churney (1964-2007), English composer, pianist, arranger and musical director, brother of Sophia Churney
 Sophia Churney (active from 1998), English singer-songwriter, sister of Russell Churney

Fictional characters
 Mayor Churney, a fictional character in the 2001 Fox Family television film When Good Ghouls Go Bad

See also 
 Charni Road railway station (AKA Churney Road railway station), a railway station on the Western Line of the Mumbai Suburban Railway
 Cerney (disambiguation)
 Czerny (disambiguation)